The 20903 / 20904 Ekta Nagar–Varanasi Mahamana Express is an Superfast Express train belonging to Western Railway zone that runs between  and  in India. It is currently being operated with 20903/20904 train numbers on a weekly basis.

Coach composition

The train has LHB rakes with max speed of 110 kmph. The train consists of 20 coaches:

 1 First AC
 2 AC II Tier
 2 AC III Tier
 8 Sleeper coaches
 1 Pantry car
 4 General Unreserved
 2 EOG cum Luggage Rake

Service

20903/Ekta Nagar – Varanasi Mahamana Express has an average speed of 58 km/hr and covers 1531 km in 26 hrs 35 mins.

20904/Varanasi – Ekta Nagar Mahamana Express has an average speed of 59 km/hr and covers 1531 km in 25 hrs 50 mins.

Route and halts 

The important halts of the train are:

Traction

Both trains are hauled by a Vadodara Loco Shed-based WAP-7 (HOG)-equipped locomotive from Ekta Nagar to Varanasi and vice versa.

Rake sharing

The train shares its rake with 20905/20906 Ekta Nagar–Rewa Mahamana Express.

See also 

 Ekta Nagar railway station
 Varanasi Junction railway station
 Mahamana Express

References

Notes

External links 

20903/Ekta Nagar - Varanasi Mahamana Express India Rail Info
20904/Ekta Nagar - Kevadiya Mahamana Express India Rail Info

Rail transport in Gujarat
Rail transport in Madhya Pradesh
Rail transport in Maharashtra
Transport in Vadodara
Passenger trains originating from Varanasi
Mahamana Express trains
Memorials to Madan Mohan Malaviya
Railway services introduced in 2017